Ibong Adarna is a 16th-century Filipino epic poem. It is about an eponymous magical bird. The longer form of the story's title during the Spanish era was "Korido at Buhay na Pinagdaanan ng Tatlong Prinsipeng Magkakapatid na anak ni Haring Fernando at ni Reyna Valeriana sa Kahariang Berbanya" ("Corrido and Life Lived by the Three Princes, children of King Fernando and Queen Valeriana in the Kingdom of Berbania"), and is believed by some researchers to have been based on similar European stories. The tale is also known as The Adarna Bird.

The story revolves around the life of King Fernando, Queen Valeriana and their three sons, Don Pedro, Diego, and Juan. The three princes, after discovering their father has fallen sick and cannot be healed, set out to find the fabled Adarna bird and heal him; whoever brings the bird first will inherit the throne. The story is commonly attributed to the Tagalog poet José de la Cruz or "Huseng Sisiw"; however, he has not been proven to be the actual author; although Facebook and other online fora cite Wikipedia as being the source of the information that Ibong Adarna was brought to the Philippines by Miguel López de Legazpi, this is not the case as it is with other European stories brought to the Philippines. According to Eulogio Balan Rodriguez, the then 1893
Assistant Director, of the National Library, "According to the more reliable studies on the subject the tale is of Pre-Spanish origin and so is indigenous Philippines literature, although it is not free in its 19th century version from outside influence, like the other native corridos that were "derived" from European romances, that are greatly saturated with the "medieval flavor and setting of chivalry". It is comparable or possibly on a par with the world-famous Arabian Nights' Entertainments a book included in the outside reading texts of both public and private schools."

The poem forms part of the curriculum for Junior High School students as well as those in Grade 7 in the Philippines.

Plot
King Fernando and his wife Queen Valeriana rule the Kingdom of Berbanya and have three children: Don Pedro, Don Diego, and Don Juan. King Fernando falls severely ill after growing despondent over a dream he had one night of Don Juan, his most favored son, being murdered by two traitors. His constituents are unable to cure him, so he sends his eldest son, Don Pedro, to search for the Ibong Adarna, a mythical bird, after an old doctor revealed that the bird's marvelous songs could cure the king's mysterious illness. After three months of wandering through forests and thickets, Don Pedro arrives at a golden tree, Piedras Platas, and falls down at its foot due to fatigue, unaware that the bird roosts there for the night. By nightfall, Don Pedro is lulled into a deep sleep after the bird sings the first of its seven songs with a sweet melody, and is turned into stone after the bird excretes on him after the seventh song.

With the disappearance of Don Pedro, King Fernando then sends his second son Don Diego to search for the bird. Don Diego undergoes the same hardships (but ventures for five months, two more than Don Pedro) and meets the same fate as his older brother. After three whole years without hearing any more news, Don Juan, the youngest son is (unwillingly, by King Fernando) sent forth also. Don Juan, however, has the fortune to meet on his way an old hermit who is impressed by the virtues and good manners of the young prince. The old hermit, knowing the mission on which Don Juan embarks, puts him on guard against the treacheries of the bird.

The hermit told Don Juan of the golden tree where the famed bird roosts every night after singing seven songs, warning of the spells in its seven songs which lulls the hearer to sleep and the excretion which petrifies anyone. He provides Don Juan with a knife and dayap lemons, both of which Juan must use to cut seven wounds on his hands and distill them into the juice of the fruits to create pain that will prevent him from being lulled by the seven songs. The hermit then gave Juan a golden rope that the prince must use to bind the bird's legs while it is asleep and place it inside a cage. Before Juan leaves, the hermit provides him with a bucket which he must use to scoop water from a well near the tree and pour it over his two petrified brothers to restore them. Don Juan did as was bidden and soon finds himself in possession of the desired bird and on his way back to his home country with his two brothers, Don Pedro and Don Diego. Don Juan's venture in search of the Ibong Adarna lasts for four months in total.

However, on the way back, with his brothers and the Ibong Adarna in tow, Don Juan's older brothers grow envious; after all, Don Juan has obtained what they were not able to. Therefore, the two older brothers conspired between themselves to do away with him. Don Pedro suggested that they should kill him, but Don Diego, who was less brutal, convinced Pedro that it was sufficient to beat him, which they did. After beating Don Juan to whom they owed their lives, they left him unconscious in the middle of the road as the two brothers continued on their way to the palace. Once in the palace, they convinced the king that they never knew what happened to Don Juan, but the bird was disheveled and did not sing for it awaits Don Juan—its true captor. Don Juan woke eventually, but could not move due to the pain caused by the beating. He prayed fervently for the health of the king and the forgiveness of God to his brothers. The same hermit who gave him advice before catching the bird arrives and heals him magically. Upon return to the palace, everyone was happy except his two brothers, worried that Don Juan might tell the king what had happened. The bird then started to sing. Its enchanted song revealed to the king that Don Pedro and Don Diego beat up Don Juan and that he was the true captor of the bird.

The two were sentenced to being cut off from the royalty and banished, but they were reprieved due to Don Juan being forgiving and asking to give them another chance.

They were given one, however, any consequent fault would mean death. They enjoyed the bird, they did not treat it as a pet, but rather like a person. So they made the three princes watch over the bird for 3 hours each every day. Don Pedro wanted revenge, so he conspired again and forced Don Diego to go on board with it yet again. They planned to trick Don Juan into thinking that under his watch, the bird escaped. They successfully did it and Don Juan set out to find the bird before the king wakes up. The king finds the bird missing and so is Don Juan, so he asked the two to find the bird and their brother.

They found Don Juan at Mt. Armenia and decide to settle there, on the beautiful mountain. They lived happily forgetting trouble from the past. They find a well and decide to explore the inside, arguing about who goes first. They settle for the idea that Pedro, the eldest, be the first to descend by means of a cord lowered by the two brothers who remain above; but he had scarcely gone a third of the way when he feels afraid and gives the sign for his two brothers to pull him out of the well. Presently, Diego was let down but he too could not go farther down than half of the way. When it was Juan's turn to go he allowed himself to be let down to the lowest depths of the cistern. There the prince discovered two enchanted palaces, the first being occupied by Princess Juana who informed him she was being held prisoner by a giant, and the second by Princess Leonora, also the prisoner of a large seven-headed serpent. After killing the giant and the serpent, the prince tugged on the cord and soon came up to the surface of the earth with the two captive princesses, whom his two brothers soon wanted to take away from him. Diego desired Princess Juana for himself and Pedro wanted Princess Leonora. Before the parting, however, Leonora discovered that she left her ring in the innermost recesses of the well. Juan voluntarily offered to take it for her but when he was halfway down, the two brothers let go of the rope he was descending causing him to fall to the bottom of the well. Not long after, wedding bells were rung in the palace; Diego married Princess Juana. Before casting her lot with Prince Pedro, Princess Leonora requested her marriage to him be delayed for a term of seven years because she might still have a chance to unite with Don Juan.

Don Juan, thanks to Leonora's enchanted ring found in the well, could avail himself of the help of a wolf which cured him of his wounds, fix his dislocations, and bring him to the medicinal waters of the Jordan, and took him out of the well. Already torn between all hope of ever finding the Adarna, Don Juan resolved to return to the Kingdom. But to his confusion, he was unable to find his way. No one could tell him precisely which was the way that would lead him to the kingdom of his father. While sleeping under a tree, the Adarna awakens him and convinces him to turn his back on Leonora because Maria Blanca, the daughter of King Salermo in Reino de Los Cristales was better. He came to a hermit that consulted all of the animals from the surrounding areas, but none of them could tell the prince the direction towards Reino de Los Cristales. But the king of all these animals, a swiftly soaring eagle (real name Olicornio), having compassion for his troubles, offered to take the prince to wherever he desired. After an epic flight, the prince and the eagle came to a distant crystal lake, whose shores they landed to rest from their long and tiresome flight. Then the eagle related to his companion the secrets of the crystal lake. This was the bathing place where, in certain hours of the day, the three daughters of the most powerful and most feared king of the surrounding regions used to dive into the water and swim; and for this reason, it was not proper for the prince to commit any indiscretion if he desired to remain and see the spectacle of the bath. Don Juan remained and when the hour of the bathing arrived he saw plunging into the pure crystal water the figures of the three most beautiful princesses whom his sinful eyes had ever seen. He then secretly hid and kept one of the princess's dresses. When the princess noticed the theft, her two sisters had already gone. The prince hurriedly ran to her and on his knee begged her pardon and placed at her feet her stolen dress and at the same time poured forth the most ardent and tender professions of love. Pleased by his gentleness and gallant phrases, the princess also fell in love with him; but she advised him that it would be better for him to leave before her father discovers his intrusion. If he did not do so he would be converted into another piece of stone for the walls of the enchanted palace in which they live, in the same way, that all the other suitors who aspired for their hands had been transformed. On being informed of the adventure of the bold prince, the king sent for him.

Don Juan, who would risk everything for the privilege of seeing his beloved, presented himself to the king in spite of the princess' warning. The king, greatly impressed with the youth's tact and self-possession, chose to give him a series of tests both gigantic and impossible for ordinary mortals. After completing these trials the king was satisfied and offered Don Juan his daughter. However, the princess, fearing that her father might resort to a new trick to foil their happiness, ordered the prince to direct himself to the royal stables in order to take the best horse and have him ready for them to flee on that same night. Unfortunately, the prince in his hurry, took the wrong horse and the king came immediately went in pursuit of the fugitives. The king, riding the best horse, pursued them tenaciously but through the use of cunning magic, the princess helped them to outrace the king.

When at last they found themselves safe and free, it did not take them long before they could reach the portals of the Berbanian Kingdom. But the prince, alleging that he should have such preparations duly made for entry into the royal palace as are appropriate for her category and dignity, left Doña Maria on the way promising to return for her once he had informed the committee to receive her. Once in the midst of the happiness of palace life, Don Juan soon forgot his profession of love to Doña Maria. He became dazzled by the beauty of Princess Leonora who had been waiting for him during all the days of his absence and he sought her hand in marriage while Doña Maria was impatiently waiting for his return. When she discovered Don Juan's infidelity, the pilgrim princess made use of the talisman which she always carried with her and adorned it with the most beautiful royal garments and carried in a large coach drawn by eight sorrel-colored horses with four palfreys, she presented herself at the door of the palace practically inviting herself to the royal wedding of Prince Juan and Princess Leonora.

Out of respect for a so beautiful guest from foreign lands and on the occasion of the wedding itself, there were celebrated tournaments, in one Doña Maria succeeded in inserting as one of the number dance of a negrita and a negrito created from nothing through her marvelous talisman. In the dance the negrita carried a whip in her hand and with it she pitilessly lashed her negrito partner, calling him Don Juan, while she proceeded to remind of all the vicissitudes of fortune undergone by him at the side on Doña Maria, the part which was played by the whipping negrito: the scene of the bath, the different tests to which he had been subjected by her father, the flight of both that was full of accidents, and his cruel abandonment of her on the way. Every crack of the whip which fell on the shoulders of the negrito was felt by Don Juan as if it was him who was being whipped. After all this, Don Juan finally remembered Doña Maria. He then gave Princess Leonora and the kingdom of Berbania to Prince Pedro while he and Doña Maria returned to Reino de los Cristales. When they came back, they found the kingdom in a mourning state, following the deaths of Doña Maria's father and sisters. The kingdom rejoiced when they came back and crowned them their king and queen.

Description

The Ibong Adarna is often described as the most colorful bird in Philippine folklore. It is also thought to share a resemblance to other legendary birds such as the Sarimanok and the phoenix.

Being one of the most colorful birds endemic in the Philippines, local birders associate the Philippine trogon (Harpactes ardens) to the mythical bird.

Analysis 
According to professor Damiana Eugenio, the Ibong Adarna or The Adarna Bird epic reworks and combines themes from recognizable folktales of the international Aarne-Thompson-Uther Index, namely types ATU 551, "The Sons on a Quest for a Wonderful Remedy for their Father"; ATU 301, "The Three Stolen Princesses" (hero's descent into a lower world, pit or hole to rescue kidnapped princesses), and ATU 313, "The Magical Flight" (hero meets villain's daughter and falls in love with her; her father imposes tasks on the hero; hero and villain's daughter escape together at the end of the tale).

According to Dean Fansler, the romance is very popular in the archipelago, with at least five different language printings: Tagalog, Pampango, Visayan, Ilocano and Bicol. The differences between the literary versions led Fansler to believe in a folkloric origin for the tale.

Motifs 
Dean Fansler recognized that the wooing of Maria, the enchanter's daughter, by prince Juan was "reminiscent" of swan maiden tales: hero steals clothes of bathing maidens.

Cultural significance

In other media
The story of Ibong Adarna is known all over the Philippines and has been told in different languages and media.

Films

1940s
Narcisa “Doña Sisang” de Leon of LVN Studios produced the first two "Ibong Adarna" films. The first one, made in 1941, starred Mila del Sol as Prinsesa Maria, Fred Cortes as Prinsipe Juan, Ester Magalona, Vicente Oliver, Deanna Prieto, Ben Rubio and Angeles Gayoso who voiced the Ibong Adarna. It had a magical sequence that showed the singing of the bird. That used a painstakingly hand-painted process called "Varicolor", where the bird was colorized in this otherwise black and white film. LVN was able to archive copies of the film which was shown again in theaters after the war in the late 40s and 50s.

1950s
Fifteen years later, in 1956, LVN produced a second version, this time under the full direction of an older Manuel Conde, and starred Nida Blanca, Nestor de Villa, Carlos Salazar, Cecilia Lopez, Nita Javier and Jose Vergara. The 1956 film was the first Filipino commercial film shot and shown in its entirety in Eastman Color.

1970s
Roda Film Productions produced 2 movies, "Ibong Adarna" (1972) and its sequel "Ang Hiwaga ng Ibong Adarna" (1973) starring Philippine Comedy King Dolphy as the lead Prince Adolfo and comedians Panchito Alba as Prince Alfonso, Babalu as Prince Albano and Rosanna Ortiz as the Ibong Adarna.

1990s
Tagalog Pictures, Inc. produced the film "Si Prinsipe Abante At Ang Lihim ng Ibong Adarna" in 1990 starring comedian Rene Requiestas as the lead Prinsipe Abante, Paquito Diaz as Prinsipe Atras, Joaquin Fajardo as Prinsipe Urong-Sulong (synonymous to atras-abante) and Monica Herrera as Prinsesa Luningning/the Ibong Adarna.

In 1996, Star Cinema produced the movie "Ang TV Movie: The Adarna Adventure". Jolina Magdangal played the Ibong Adarna/Prinsesa Adarna. The cast included Nida Blanca as Lola Binyang, Tirso Cruz III as Prinsipe Diego, Dindo Arroyo as Prinsipe Pedro, Gio Alvarez as Prinsipe Juan and Gamaliel Viray as Hari ng Berbanya along with the kids and teens of Ang TV.

"Adarna: The Mythical Bird"  which premiered on December 25, 1997, is the first full-length Filipino local animated film. It starred Jolina Magdangal—who previously played the Ibong Adarna—as the voice of Adarna along with other voice casts: Marvin Agustin, Martin Nievera and Regine Velasquez. Nievera and Velasquez sung the soundtrack "Touched by Your Love" and "Nagmamahal", "Believe It" was performed by Velasquez and "Halakhak" by The Youth.

2010s
A young man sets out on a dangerous quest for a magical bird with the power to heal any ailment in "Ibong Adarna: The Pinoy Adventure". The 2014 film starred Rocco Nacino as Prinsipe Sigasig, Joel Torre as	Sultan Mabait, Angel Aquino	as Sultana Mabunyi, Leo Martinez as Datu Maimbot, Benjie Paras as Sipsipayo, Ronnie Lazaro as Dulangkaw, Patricia Fernandez as Diwata, Lilia Cuntapay as Bruha, Gary Lising as Nuno ng Lipi, Miss Intercontinental 2018 Karen Gallman as Adarna and Philip "Kohol" Supnet as Higante.

2020s

MALA (Movies Adapted from Literary Arts): Ibong Adarna
“MALA” (Movies Adapted from Literary Arts), an educational puppetry film series for children directed by actor Xian Lim and written by renowned ventriloquist Ronaldo "Ony" Carcamo, is part of the Cultural Center of the Philippines' "Sining Sigla", a season-long virtual outreach program of the CCP Office of the President Arsenio “Nick” Lizaso. Lim and Carcamo used muppets, visual effects and live action with music and poetry in the dialogue on their adaptation. MALA's production designers are shadowplay and puppet designer Aina Ramolete and production designer and art director Kaye Banaag. Joined by music composer Jem Florendo and sound designer Miguel Hernandez.

New 4K Digital Scan of Ibong Adarna (1941)
In time for the 100th year of Philippine cinema, Cinema One brought the film that was scanned in a high definition 4K resolution back via cable TV on June 30, 2019.

 Ibong Adarna was the opening full-length film of the 12th Cinema Rehiyon held on February 24–28, 2020, at Naga City, Camarines Sur.

Television
In 2013, GMA Network produced Adarna, a contemporary television series adaptation starring Kylie Padilla in the title role.

In the 50th episode of season 1 of GMA's drama fantasy anthology series Daig Kayo ng Lola Ko which aired on April 22, 2018, lola Goreng (Gloria Romero) narrated the story of the Ibong Adarna. The episode starred Kyline Alcantara as Ibong Adarna, Jeric Gonzales as Juan, Lucho Ayala as Pedro, Aaron Yanga as Diego and Rey 'PJ' Abellana as Fernando.

Theater

Ballet
Ballet Manila soloist Abigail Oliveiro took on the role of Ibong Adarna with Mark Sumaylo as Don Pedro, Romeo Peralta as Don Diego and Ballet Manila's Principal dancer Rudy de Dios as Don Juan.

It featured music by Diwa de Leon, with Gia Macuja Atchison as the voice of Ibong Adarna, and script by Angela Blardony Ureta.

Ballet Manila's CEO and Artistic Director Lisa Macuja-Elizalde described the show as "a modern ballet with neo-classical and classical styles that serve as the cornerstone of the dance vocabulary." It even featured the Alitaptap Dance and the Monkey Dance.  It made its world premiere on August 26, 2017, at the Aliw Theater stage.

Musical

REP staged an English version of the epic which featured fun, child-friendly music, and bright and colorful costumes.

Art and literature 

 Project Gutenberg also has a version of the epic in its library.

Books

National costume in beauty pageants
Miss Universe 2018 Catriona Gray’s preliminary gown by Mak Tumang at the Miss Universe preliminary competition was called “Adarna: Blazing Siren.” Her gown which was inspired by the Ibong Adarna and the Phoenix Mikimoto Crown was adorned with layers of embroidered gold feathers and thousands of hand-placed genuine Swarovski crystals in different shades of orange and topaz; she paired it with a nationalistic pair of dangling earrings she designed herself, Tessera Jewelry executed her vision with the Philippine sun and golden South sea pearls.

References

External links
Adarna House website

Ibong Adarna
Fictional birds
Legendary birds
Filipino poems
Philippine literature
Turin in fiction